Kenny Teijsse (born 19 July 1992) is a Dutch professional footballer who plays as a midfielder for AFC.

He formerly played for FC Utrecht and on loan for both FC Oss, Helmond Sport and also Go Ahead Eagles in the Dutch Eredivisie.

His twin brother, Yordi Teijsse, is also a professional footballer.

References

External links
 

1992 births
Living people
Dutch twins
Identical twins
Twin sportspeople
Association football midfielders
Dutch footballers
FC Utrecht players
TOP Oss players
Helmond Sport players
Sparta Rotterdam players
Go Ahead Eagles players
San Francisco Deltas players
SC Cambuur players
Amsterdamsche FC players
Eredivisie players
Eerste Divisie players
Tweede Divisie players
North American Soccer League players
Footballers from Amsterdam